The UCI Hall of Fame, that not to be confused with Cycling Hall of Fame or the University of California, Irvine's Hall of Fame, was launched by the Union Cycliste Internationale (UCI) in 2002 to "honor all those who by their heroic deeds or their personalities have greatly contributed to the glory and development of cycling sport throughout the world". The inauguration was part of the celebrations marking the 100th anniversary of both the Paris–Roubaix race and the founding of the UCI, which also included the opening of the World Cycling Centre in Aigle, Switzerland, where the hall of fame is located. There have been no inductions since 2002.

Hall of Fame members

References

UCI
Cycling museums and halls of fame
Halls of fame in Switzerland
Hall
Awards established in 2002
Aigle
Museums in the canton of Vaud